

Events

Works
 Lucas de Tuy and others, Chronicon Mundi ("Great Chronicle of the World")

Births
 Wen Tianxiang (died 1283), Chinese scholar-general, poet, chancellor

Deaths

Notes

13th-century poetry
Poetry